William Cross (17 June 1883 – 12 April 1949) was a Scottish professional footballer who played as an outside forward in the Scottish League for Third Lanark and Port Glasgow Athletic. He also played for Southern League clubs Brentford and Queens Park Rangers and represented the Southern League XI.

Personal life 
Cross was the brother of fellow Third Lanark and Queens Park Rangers footballer John Cross.

Career statistics

References 

1883 births
1949 deaths
Scottish footballers
English Football League players
Scottish Football League players
Scottish Junior Football Association players
Brentford F.C. players
Southern Football League players
Association football outside forwards
Third Lanark A.C. players
Queens Park Rangers F.C. players
People from Cambusnethan
Port Glasgow Athletic F.C. players
Cambuslang Rangers F.C. players
Sportspeople from Wishaw
Southern Football League representative players
Footballers from North Lanarkshire